Kallapart Natarajan was an Indian actor who works in Tamil-language films. He received the moniker 'Kallapart' from his role as a thief (Kallapart) in stage dramas.

Selected filmography 
Marumagal (1953)
Nalla Idathu Sammandham (1958)
Kaithi Kannayiram (1960)
Deivapiravi (1960)
Naagamalai Azhagi (1962)
Sengamala Theevu (1962)
Madras to Pondicherry (1966)
Kan Kanda Deivam (1967)
Kallum Kaniyagum (1968)
Oli Vilakku (1968)
Neelagiri Express (1968)
 Kasturi Thilakam (1970)
 Kankaatchi (1971)
 Kettikaran (1971)
 Sange Muzhangu (1972)
Thevar Magan (1992)

Awards 
Kalaimamani by Tamil Nadu Government

References

External links 

Actors in Tamil theatre
Actors in Tamil cinema
Tamil actors